Football Hall of Fame may refer to:

American football
College Football Hall of Fame
Pro Football Hall of Fame, located in Canton, Ohio

Association football
English Football Hall of Fame
Football Federation Australia Hall of Fame
National Soccer Hall of Fame
Scottish Football Hall of Fame

Australian rules football
Australian Football Hall of Fame
South Australian Football Hall of Fame
Tasmanian Football Hall of Fame
West Australian Football Hall of Fame

Canadian football
Canadian Football Hall of Fame